This article covers euro gold and silver commemorative coins issued by the Central Bank and Financial Services Authority of Ireland. It also covers rare cases of collectors coins (coins not planned for normal circulation) minted using other precious metals.  It does not cover either the Irish €2 commemorative coins or the Irish Pound commemorative coins.

For euro gold and silver commemorative coins of other countries see Euro gold and silver commemorative coins.

Listed by year

2003 coinage

2004 coinage

2005 coinage

2006 coinage

2007 coinage

2008 coinage

2009 coinage

2010 coinage

2011 coinage

2012 coinage

2013 coinage

2014 coinage

A silver 10 Euro commemorating John McCormack (1884–1945), Irish tenor and Papal Count.

A gold 20 Euro commemorating the 1000th anniversary of the Battle of Clontarf.

A silver 15 Euro commemorating the centenary of the death of John Philip Holland (1840–1914), an Irish engineer regarded as the father of the modern submarine.

2015 coinage

A silver 15 Euro Proof Coin commemorating Ernest Walton (1903–1995), an Irish physicist and 1951 Nobel laureate for being the first person to artificially split the atom.

A silver 15 Euro Proof Coin commemorating the 150th anniversary of the birth of W. B. Yeats, Irish poet and Nobel Laureate.

A silver 10 Euro Proof Coin commemorating the 70th anniversary of the end of World War II and the 70th anniversary of peace in Europe.

2016 coinage

Centenary of the Easter Rising: a €15 silver coin and €50 gold coin, both depicting Hibernia.

A .925 sterling silver proof 10 Euros depicting architect and furniture designer Eileen Gray, the first woman to appear on an Irish commemorative coin, sold for €60 each. Some of these coins were found to be blemished, and the Central Bank offered a refund.

2017 coinage

€15 silver proof coin depicting electrical engineer Sir Charles Algernon Parsons.

10 Euros silver proof coin depicting the Ha'penny Bridge.

15 Euros commemorating Gulliver's Travels, satirical 1726 novel by Irish author Jonathan Swift.

2018 coinage

€15 Silver Proof to commemorate the 70th anniversary of Rory Gallagher's birth. (Part 1 of the "Modern Irish Musicians" series)

€15 Silver Proof Coin to Commemorate Bram Stoker’s Dracula.

€15 silver proof coin commemorating the centenary of women's suffrage.

2019 coinage

€100 half-ounce gold proof coin to mark the centenary of the First Dáil.

€15 silver proof coin to mark the centenary of the transatlantic flight of Alcock and Brown, which landed in Ireland.

€15 silver proof coin to commemorate the 70th anniversary of Phil Lynott's birth. (Part 2 of the "Modern Irish Musicians" series)

2021 coinage

€10 silver proof coin depicting Christ Church Cathedral, Dublin to commemorate Gothic architecture in Ireland. (part of the Europa coin programme)

2022 coinage
€15 silver proof coin to commemorate the 80th anniversary of Luke Kelly's birth. (Part 3 of the "Modern Irish Musicians" series)

€15 silver proof coin to commemorate Kathleen Lynn.

€100 gold proof coin to mark the centenary of the foundation of the Irish Free State.

See also

Commemorative coins of Ireland
€2 commemorative coins
Ireland 2007 commemorative 2 euro coin

Notes

References

 

Ireland
Coins of Ireland
Coins of the Republic of Ireland